The Seventh Finance Commission of India was incorporated in 1978 consisting of Shri J. M. Shelar as the chairman.

Members 
The members of the Commission were:
 Shri J. M. Shelat, Chair
 Dr. Raj Krishna
 Dr. C. H. Hanumantha Rao
 Shri. H. N. Ray
 Shri. V. B. Eswaran, Member Secretary

Recommendations
 The share of the states in the net proceeds should be raised to 85% excepting the share of the Union Territories which would be 2.19% of net proceeds
 The inter se distribution between the states should include 10% contribution factor and rest 90% would be on basis of population. The 10% allotment would be based on the State-wise net assessments

References

Further References 
 
 

Finance Commission of India
1978 establishments in India